Potturi Vijayalakshmi (తెలుగు:పొత్తూరి విజయలక్ష్మి) is a Telugu writer well known for her humorous short stories.

Biography
Potturi Vijayalakshmi was born in Yajali village in Guntur District, Andhra Pradesh to Ms. Valluri Satyavaani and Mr. Valluri Venkata Krishna Murthy. She married Mr. P V Siva Rao in 1970 and has two children Sireesha and Praveen Kumar. She currently lives in Hyderabad, Andhra Pradesh with her family.

Vijayalakshmi penned around 250 short stories and 14 novels in Telugu language. Her first novel, "Premalekha", was made into a movie directed by Jandhyala. She also worked at All India Radio. She is well known for her humorous short stories which appeared in many Telugu weeklies like Eenadu Aadivaaram, Chatura and Andhra Jyothi, to name a few. These short stories, along with her other stories, were compiled into books of Telugu short stories.

Publications
Books of Telugu short stories written by Vijayalakshmi:

 Hasya Kathalu (Stories from this book were published in Eenadu Aadivaram)
 Chandrahaaram
 Maa inti Ramayanam
 Aanandame Andam
 Premalekha
 Pottoori vijayalakshmi haasya kadhalu 
 Aatmakadha  
 Koncham ishtam koncham kashtam 
 Sanmaanam.
 Script  sidhhamgaa vundi - cinimaa tiyyandi
 Pottoori vijayalakshmi  haasya kadhalu  revised edition
 Poorvi
 Jnaapakaala  Jaavali

Awards and recognitions
 Potti Sreeramulu Telugu University Trust Award, 2007
 Sri Krishna Mohan Rao Memorial Award, 2007
 SeshaaRatnam Memorial Award, 2009
 Gruha lakshmi swarna mananam, 2012
 Apuroopa haasya prasaaram, 2015
 Munimaanikyam Haasya puraskaaram, 2015
 Delhi Telugu academy udyog BHAARAT PURASKAAR, 2016
 Bhanumati puraskaaram
 Saahitee siromani title by Kavali
 Telugu Sahiti.

 * Vijay Bhavna ugadi puraskaram by 
 Vijayanagaram in  2019.

 Hasya kalaapoorna title by
Vijaya Bhavana association vijayanagaram in 2019.

 Suseela Narayan Reddy award
  In 2021.

References

External links
 http://www.cpbrownacademy.org/telugu_book_reviews.asp

1953 births
Living people
20th-century Indian short story writers
Telugu writers
People from Guntur district
Writers from Andhra Pradesh
Telugu women writers
Women writers from Andhra Pradesh
20th-century women writers
20th-century Indian women